James Joshua Edelman (born 9 January 1974) has been a justice of the High Court of Australia since 30 January 2017, and is a former justice of the Federal Court of Australia and the Supreme Court of Western Australia. He is noted for his various achievements at a young age, including becoming a professor at Oxford University before the age of 35 and a justice of the Supreme Court of Western Australia before the age of 40. He was 43 years old upon commencing his appointment on the High Court and is eligible to continue until reaching the constitutionally required retirement age of 70 in 2044.

Education
Edelman completed high school at Scotch College in Perth, Western Australia. He completed bachelor's degrees in Economics (1995) and Law (first class honours, 1996) at the University of Western Australia and a Bachelor of Commerce (1997) at Murdoch University.

He was awarded a Rhodes Scholarship in 1998 and completed a doctorate at Magdalen College, University of Oxford in 2001.

Career

Legal
Edelman was admitted to practice in the Supreme Court of Western Australia in 1998 after serving as an associate to Justice John Toohey in the High Court of Australia in 1997 and completing an articled clerkship at Blake Dawson Waldron. He was a member of the Chambers of Malcolm McCusker QC from 2001 until his appointment as a justice in 2011.

Edelman was called to the English bar in 2008 and was a member of One Essex Court chambers.

Academic
Edelman became a tutor at Keble College, Oxford, in 2005.

Following his appointment to the Supreme Court, Edelman continued to teach as an Adjunct Professor at the University of Queensland and University of Western Australia, as well as holding the honorary position of Conjoint Professor at the University of New South Wales.

Edelman is also a patron and former editor of the Oxford University Commonwealth Law Journal.

Edelman has been noted as having a "prodigious" record of publications. At the time of his appointment to the Supreme Court, his publications included six books and more than 80 articles, reviews, and notes.

Judicial
Edelman was appointed to the Supreme Court of Western Australia in April 2011 following the retirement of Justice Peter Blaxell. He took the oath of office on 22 July 2011. It was reported that, at the age of 37, Edelman was the youngest person to join the Supreme Court bench. However, at the welcome ceremony for Edelman, Chief Justice Wayne Martin noted that the reports were incorrect and in fact Sir Lawrence Jackson was appointed at the age of 36 in 1949.

In April 2015, Edelman was appointed to the Federal Court of Australia. He replaced Justice Peter Jacobson, who had retired in January 2015.

In November 2016, it was announced that Edelman would be appointed as a Justice of the High Court of Australia. He commenced the appointment when Justice Susan Kiefel became Chief Justice of Australia on 30 January 2017. He is the fourth youngest person to join the Court, after H. V. Evatt, Sir Edward McTiernan and Sir Owen Dixon.

Personal
Edelman is married and has two children. Edelman is Jewish.

Bibliography
  (with Elise Bant)
  (with Simone Degeling)
  (with Andrew S. Burrows and Ewan McKendrick)
  (with Elise Bant)
  (with Derek Ian Cassidy)

References

1974 births
Living people
Australian Jews
Australian Rhodes Scholars
Judges of the Supreme Court of Western Australia
Judges of the Federal Court of Australia
Justices of the High Court of Australia
University of Western Australia alumni
Murdoch University alumni
Alumni of Magdalen College, Oxford